The Collie Sub-basin is a pocket of Permian sedimentary rocks  with an area of 225 km2, enclosed within much older Archean rocks of the Yilgarn Craton, near the town of Collie in southwestern Western Australia., Once considered a unique basin, this area, along with the smaller Wilga and Boyup Sub-basins to the south, are now classified as outliers of the Perth Basin, separated from the main area by ancient earth movements and erosion. The Collie Sub-basin contains significant coal reserves, currently being mined mainly for electricity generation.

References

Geology of Western Australia
Sedimentary basins of Australia
Landforms of Western Australia
Collie, Western Australia